Miconia albicans is a species of shrub in the family Melastomataceae. It is known as canela-de-velho in Brazilian Portuguese. It is native to North and South America.

References

albicans
Flora of Peru
Flora of Mexico
Flora of Belize
Flora of Panama
Flora of Nicaragua
Flora of Brazil
Flora of Bolivia
Flora of Jamaica
Flora of Cuba
Flora of Paraguay
Flora of Colombia
Flora of Costa Rica
Flora of Ecuador
Flora of French Guiana
Flora of Guatemala
Flora of Guyana
Flora of Honduras
Flora of El Salvador
Flora of Venezuela
Flora of Suriname